The Shusha uezd was a county (uezd) of the Elizavetpol Governorate of the Russian Empire, and then of the Ganja Governorate of Azerbaijan Democratic Republic with its center in Shusha in 1840–1921.

Geography
The Shusha uezd was located in the southeastern portion of Elizavetpol Governorate, bordering the contiguous Jevanshir uezd on the north, the Jebrail uezd to the south, the Zangezur uezd to the west and the Baku Governorate in the east. The county was normally divided into the mountainous, submountanous and lowland parts. The gorges and valleys towards the northeast made up the submountainous areas of the uezd. The lowland part of the county is rich with rivers. The Khachinchay river formed the natural boundary between the Shusha and the Javanshir uezds.

History
The territories of Shusha uezd once formed part of the Karabakh Khanate until the latter's dissolution in 1813, when the area was ceded by Qajar Iran to the Russian Empire in accordance with the Treaty of Gulistan. Russian rule was officially established in the region by 1823.

On April 10, 1840 Shusha uezd was established as a separate administrative unit within Caspian Oblast of the empire with Shusha as its capital. From 1846 on, it was an administrative unit of Shemakha Governorate (later renamed to the Baku Governorate in 1859). In 1868, the county was incorporated into the Elizavetpol Governorate. In 1873, the territories of Javanshir and Jabrail of the Shusha uezd were detached and established as separate administrative uezds.

After the dissolution of the Russian Empire and the formation of the independent Transcaucasian republics, including the Azerbaijan Democratic Republic in 1918, the western mountainous districts of the Elizavetpol Governorate including the Shusha, Zangezur, Jebrail, Jevanshir, Kazakh and Elizavetpol uezds became subject to intense territorial disputes between Armenia and Azerbaijan throughout 1918-1920, both of whom included these areas in their territorial pretensions that they presented in memorandums to the Paris Peace Conference.

Since the collapse of Russian authority in the Transcaucasus, the mountainous portion of the county which was overwhelmingly Armenian and included the administrative center of Shusha was governed by the de facto Karabakh Council which vehemently rejected Ottoman and Azerbaijani attempts to subordinate the region. However, following the arrival of British forces in Transcaucasia, the Karabakh Council reluctantly submitted to provisional Azerbaijani rule through the Governor-Generalship of Karabakh, led by Dr. Khosrov bey Sultanov, due to the exerted British pressure on the council in August 1919.

Administrative divisions 
The subcounties (uchastoks) of the Shusha uezd in 1912 were as follows:

Economy 
The population was engaged primarily in agriculture and farming in the mountainous areas, gardening, sericulture and cattlebreeding in submountainous areas. The lowland area was used for growing cotton, which produced 20 thousand pounds of cotton per year. Vineyards covered as much as 4,494 desyatinas of land, producing 106,860 lbs of grape. Nearly 10,000 lbs of silk pods were being collected per annum. Cattlebreeding which played an important role in the regional economy accounted 38,888 of cattle, 10,918 buffalos, 133,648 sheep, 3,052 goats, 8,016 horses, 4,052 donkeys, 1,052 mules, 340 camels, 4,052 pigs.

Demographics

Russian Empire Census 
The majority of the population indicated Armenian to be their mother tongue, with significant Tatar and Russian speaking minorities.

Kavkazskiy kalendar 
The statistics indicated Armenians to be the majority of the population of the both the city Shusha and in the rest of the uezd, with a significant Shia Muslim minority:

Notes

References

Bibliography 

Geographic history of Azerbaijan
States and territories established in 1840
1921 disestablishments
Uezds of Elizavetpol Governorate
Uezds of the Soviet Union
1840 establishments in the Russian Empire